Roy Turner may refer to:

 Roy J. Turner (1894–1973), Governor of Oklahoma
 Roy Turner (Australian politician) (1922–2004), Labor member of the New South Wales Legislative Council
 Roy Turner (soccer) (born 1943), former English American soccer player